David Shields is the author of twenty-four books, including Reality Hunger (which, in 2019, Lit Hub named one of the most important books of the past decade), The Thing About Life Is That One Day You'll Be Dead (a New York Times bestseller), Black Planet (finalist for the National Book Critics Circle Award and PEN USA Award), and Other People: Takes & Mistakes (NYTBR Editors’ Choice). The Very Last Interview was published by New York Review Books in 2022. 

The film adaptation of I Think You're Totally Wrong: A Quarrel, which Shields co-wrote and co-stars in, was released in 2017. Shields wrote, produced, and directed Lynch: A History, a 2019 documentary about Marshawn Lynch's use of silence, echo, and mimicry as key tools of resistance. A new film, How We Got Here, which argues that Melville plus Nietzsche divided by the square root of (Allan) Bloom times Žižek (squared) equals Bannon, is forthcoming, as is a companion volume of the same name.

The recipient of a Guggenheim fellowship, two NEA fellowships, and the PEN/Revson Award, Shields—a senior contributing editor of the literary journal Conjunctions—has published fiction and nonfiction in the New York Times Magazine, Harper's, Esquire, Yale Review, Salon, Slate, Tin House, A Public Space, McSweeney's, Believer, Huffington Post, Los Angeles Review of Books, and Best American Essays. 

His work has been translated into two dozen languages.

Early life
Shields was born in Los Angeles in 1956 to a lower-middle-class Jewish family. He has an older sister, a half-brother, and a half-sister. Both of Shields's parents were journalists. His mother, the West Coast correspondent for the Nation for many years, was a political activist; his father worked as a speechwriter for progressive politicians. In 1962, the family moved to San Francisco, where Shields's parents were deeply involved in the local anti-war and civil rights community, frequently opening up their home to those in need of short- or long-term shelter.

In 1978, Shields graduated, Phi Beta Kappa, magna cum laude, from Brown University, with a Bachelor of Arts, with Honors, in British and American Literature. In 1980, he received a Master of Fine Arts, with Honors in Fiction, from the University of Iowa Writers' Workshop.

Career
Shields's debut novel, Heroes, about a Midwestern sportswriter's fascination with a college basketball player, was published by Simon & Schuster in 1984. From 1985 to 1988, he was a visiting assistant professor at St. Lawrence University in Canton, NY. In 1989, Knopf published Shields's second novel, Dead Languages, a semi-autobiographical novel about a boy growing up with a severe stutter. Dead Languages is a work of fiction, but it incorporates significantly larger shards of reality than Shields's first book, marking the initial phase of Shields's transition toward nonfiction, which would ultimately lead him to employ the literary collage and ‘anti-novel’ forms for which he is most well-known.

In 1992, his novel-in-stories, Handbook for Drowning, was published by Knopf. In 1996, Shields became a faculty member in the Warren Wilson College low-residency MFA Program for Writers, a position he still holds. That same year, his fourth book, Remote: Reflections on Life in the Shadow of Celebrity, Shields's first work of literary collage, was published by Knopf.

Between 1997 and 2009, Shields published five books: Black Planet: Facing Race During an NBA Season (Random House, 1999), a finalist for the National Book Critics Circle Award and PEN USA award; Baseball Is Just Baseball: The Understated Ichiro (TNI Books, 2001), which achieved bestseller status in Japan; Enough About You: Notes toward the New Autobiography (Simon & Schuster, 2002); Body Politic: The Great American Sports Machine (Simon & Schuster, 2004); and The Thing About Life Is That One Day You'll Be Dead (Knopf, 2008), a New York Times bestseller. In 2001, Shields became a visiting instructor at the Bread Loaf Writers’ Conference and has taught there ever since.

In 2010, Shields's tenth book, Reality Hunger: A Manifesto, was published by Knopf. In Vanity Fair, Elissa Schappell called Reality Hunger an “arousing call to arms for all artists to reject the laws governing appropriation, obliterate the boundaries between fiction and nonfiction, and give rise to a new modern form for a new century.” Reality Hunger was recently named one of the 100 most important books of the 2010s by LitHub. In 2011, Norton published The Inevitable: Contemporary Writers Confront Death, an anthology Shields co-edited with Brad Morrow. In 2012, New Harvest published Jeff, One Lonely Guy, a collage co-written by Shields, Jeff Ragsdale, and Michael Logan. Later that year, an anthology co-edited by Shields and Matthew Vollmer, Fakes: An Anthology of Pseudo-Interviews, Faux-Lectures, Quasi-Letters, “Found” Texts, and Other Fraudulent Artifacts, was published by Norton.

In 2013, Knopf published How Literature Saved My Life, a blend of confessional criticism and cultural autobiography. Also in 2013, Simon & Schuster published Salinger, an “oral biography” of J.D. Salinger by Shields and Shane Salerno. Salinger was a New York Times bestseller and has been translated into more than a dozen languages.

In 2015, Hawthorne Books published Life Is Short — Art is Shorter: In Praise of Brevity, which Shields co-edited with Elizabeth Cooperman. In 2015, Shields also published That Thing You Do With Your Mouth: The Sexual Autobiography of Samantha Matthews as told to David Shields (McSweeney's); I Think You're Totally Wrong: A Quarrel, co-written with Caleb Powell; and War Is Beautiful: The New York Times Pictorial Guide to the Glamour of Armed Conflict (powerHouse) a deconstruction of that newspaper's front-page war photography.

Other People: Takes & Mistakes was published by Knopf in 2017. That same year, First Pond Entertainment released the film adaptation of I Think You're Totally Wrong: A Quarrel, written by Shields and Powell, starring Shields and Powell and James Franco, and directed by Franco. The trio debate the value of life versus art; art wins, barely. The film is available now on Vudu. In 2018, Shields's book Nobody Hates Trump More Than Trump: An Intervention was published by Thought Catalog Books.

In 2019, The Trouble With Men: Reflections on Sex, Love, Marriage, Porn, and Power was published by Mad Creek Books. Later the same year, Shields's debut documentary, Lynch: A History, an ode to Marshawn Lynch’s use of silence, echo, and mimicry as key tools of resistance, premiered at the Seattle International Film Festival. The film, which Shields wrote, produced, and directed, was named one of the five best films at the International Documentary Film Festival of Amsterdam and has won numerous awards, including the Golden SunBreak Award for Best Documentary and the End of Cinema Award for Best Nonfiction Film. The film is now available on Sundance TV, AMC, First Look Media, Amazon Prime, and iTunes/AppleTV.

Critical reception 
Shields's early fiction was noted for its use of neorealism. In 1989, writing in the Virginia Quarterly Review, Lance Olsen included Shields as part of the “Next Generation of Fiction.” With the 1996 publication of Remote, which A.O. Scott described in Newsday as “one of the definitive texts of the 1990s—a trim, elegant nonfiction answer to Infinite Jest,” Shields began to build his reputation as a pioneer of collage.

Reality Hunger was highly controversial when it was published in 2010. In The New York Times Book Review, Lucy Sante wrote that the book “urgently and succinctly addresses matters that have been in the air, have relentlessly gathered momentum, and have just been waiting for someone to link them together... [Shields's] book probably heralds what will be the dominant modes in years and decades to come.” Reality Hunger has, in fact, proven extremely influential on 21st century nonfiction, “autofiction,” and documentary film. However, in the New Yorker, James Wood called the book “highly problematic” in its “unexamined promotion of what [Shields] insists on calling ‘reality’ over narrative,” although Wood did acknowledge that Shields's “arguments about the tediousness and terminality of current fictional convention are well-taken.”

In the decade since Reality Hunger, Shields has published a dozen books, many of which are collaborative and nearly all of which attempt to embody the ars poetica theorized in Reality Hunger. The first of these collaborations, Salinger, a 2013 oral biography that subtly defied the conventions of nonfiction through its piecing together of an abundance of primary material, was praised by John Walsh in the Sunday Times (London) as “a stupendous work . . . I predict with the utmost confidence that, after this, the world will not need another Salinger biography.” Shields continued to transform and remix genre in War Is Beautiful, which Heather Baysa in the Village Voice called a “disturbingly graphic book [that] follows the New York Times's war reporting for more than a decade, exposing the institution's tendency to glamorize armed combat to the point of manipulation."

I Think You're Totally Wrong: A Quarrel, a collaboration between Shields and Caleb Powell, was praised for its erasure of the boundary between mask and self, a frequent theme in Shields's work. In the Atlantic, Leslie Jamison wrote that the book's “goal isn't sympathy or forgiveness. Life is not personal. Life is evidence. It's fodder for argument. To put the ‘I’ to work this way invites a different intimacy—not voyeuristic communion but collaborative inquiry, author and reader facing the same questions from inside their inevitably messy lives.”

Lynch: A History, whose montage approach builds off of the collage style of Shields's books, marks the next major shift in Shields's career: documentary film. In the New Yorker, Hua Hsu wrote, “Lynch feels like the culmination of Shields's career. The film's relentless rhythm overwhelms and overpowers you. Random acts of terror, across time and space, reveal themselves as a pattern. It's a gradient of American carnage.”

Books 
The Very Last Interview, New York Review Books, 2022
The Trouble With Men: Reflections on Sex, Love, Marriage, Porn, and Power, Mad Creek Books, 2019
Nobody Hates Trump More than Trump: An Intervention, Thought Catalog, 2018
Other People: Takes & Mistakes, Knopf, 2017
War is Beautiful: The New York Times Pictorial Guide to the Glamour of Armed Conflict, powerHouse Books, 2015
That Thing You Do With Your Mouth: The Sexual Autobiography of Samantha Matthews, as told to David Shields, McSweeney's, 2015
Life Is Short—Art Is Shorter: In Praise of Brevity, co-edited with Elizabeth Cooperman, Hawthorne Books, 2015
I Think You're Totally Wrong: A Quarrel, co-written with Caleb Powell, Knopf, 2015
Salinger, co-written with Shane Salerno, Simon & Schuster, 2013
How Literature Saved My Life, Knopf, 2013
Fakes: An Anthology of Pseudo-Interviews, Faux-Lectures, Quasi-Letters, "Found" Texts, and Other Fraudulent Artifacts, co-edited with Matthew Vollmer, W.W. Norton, 2012
Jeff: One Lonely Guy, co-written with Jeff Ragsdale and Michael Logan, New Harvest, 2012
The Inevitable: Contemporary Writers Confront Death, co-edited with Bradford Morrow, W.W. Norton, 2011
Reality Hunger: A Manifesto, Knopf, 2010
The Thing About Life Is That One Day You'll Be Dead, Knopf, 2008
Body Politic: The Great American Sports Machine, Simon & Schuster, 2004
Enough About You: Notes Toward the New Autobiography, Simon & Schuster, 2002
Baseball Is Just Baseball" The Understated Ichiro, TNI Books, 2001
Black Planet: Facing Race during an NBA Season, Crown, 1999
Remote: Reflections on Life in the Shadow of Celebrity, Knopf, 1996
Handbook for Drowning:  A Novel in Stories, Knopf 1992
Dead Languages: A Novel, Knopf 1989
Heroes: A Novel, Simon & Schuster, 1984

Films

Awards 

Lynch: A History won the Golden SunBreak Award for Best Documentary at the Seattle International Film Festival, 2019
Lynch: A History was a finalist for Filmspotting's Golden Brick award for Best Low-Budget Indie Film of 2019, 2019
Reality Hunger (2010) named one of the 100 decade-defining books, LitHub, 2019 
Royalty Research Fund Fellowships, The University of Washington, 2016, 2008, 2002, 1997, 1989
Pabst Endowed Chair, Atlantic Center for the Arts, February/March 2015
Frye Art Museum/Artist Trust Consortium James W. Ray Distinguishes Artist Award, 2015 
One of Amazon's Best Nonfiction Books of the Year: I Think You're Totally Wrong: A Quarrel (2015)
Goodreads Choice Awards, finalist for best History/Biography, Salinger, 2013
 Artist Trust Innovative Arts Award, 2013
 &Now Awards: Best Innovative Writing, 2013
 Best American Non-Required Reading, 2012
Reality Hunger: A Manifesto named as one of the best American essays of 2008 and one of the "Essayest American Essays" by Quotidiana
4 Culture Award, 2008
John Simon Guggenheim Memorial Foundation fellowship, 2005–2006
Simpson Center for the Humanities Research Fellowship, University of Washington, 2005-2006
Body Politic named as one of the best 25 books of the year by the Seattle Times, 2004
Artist Trust Fellowships for Literature, 2003, 1991
Silver Medal, Canadian National Magazine Award, for contribution to "Fifteen Ways of Looking at Vince Carter" in Saturday Night magazine, 2001
Finalist, National Book Critics Circle Award, for Black Planet, 2000
Finalist, PEN USA Award, for Black Planet, 2000
Black Planet named one of the 10 best nonfiction books of the year by Esquire, Newsday, LA Weekly, and Amazon, 2000
First prize, Web del Sol creative Non-Quiction Contest, 1999
Distinguished Author's Award, Brandeis University National Women's Committee, 1994
Seattle Arts Commission Fellowship, 1992
King County Arts Commission Independent Artist New Works Award, 1992
PEN/Revson Foundation Fellowship, 1992
National Endowment for the Arts Fellowships in Fiction, 1991, 1982 
Residency fellowships: Corporation of Yaddo (3), MacDowell Colony (2), Virginia Center for the Creative Arts (3), Ragdale Foundation (2), Millay Colony (Edna St. Vincent Millay Award), Cummington Community of the Arts, Centrum—1982-1991
Washington State Book Award for Dead Languages, 1990
Silver Medal, Commonwealth Club of California Book Awards, for Dead Languages, 1989
Short story "Audrey" chosen as one of the "Ten Best" stories in the PEN Syndicated Fiction Project and included with two others in a program of short fiction presented at The Library of Congress, 1989
PEN Syndicated Fiction winter, 1988 1985
New York Foundation for the Arts Fellowship, 1988
Ingram Merill Foundation award, 1983
James D. Phelan Literary Award, San Francisco Foundation, 1981
Michener-Copernicus Society of America Award, 1980-1982

References

External links 
 

 

Living people
1956 births
Brown University alumni
Iowa Writers' Workshop alumni